Events from the year 1572 in art.

Events

Works

 Giuseppe Arcimboldo – Summer
 Federico Barocci – Portrait of Francisco II della Rovere (Uffizi)
 Lucas de Heere (attributed) – The Family of Henry VIII, an Allegory of the Tudor Succession (approximate date)
 Nicholas Hilliard - Portrait miniature and (approximate date) Pelican Portrait of Elizabeth I of England
 Paolo Veronese
 Allegory of the Battle of Lepanto (approximate date)
 Feast of St Gregory the Great

Births
date unknown
Jan Antonisz van Ravesteyn, painter of the Dutch court in The Hague (died 1657)
Fabrizio Boschi, Italian painter of the early-Baroque period, active in Florence (died 1642)
Barend van Someren, Dutch Golden Age painter (died 1632)
probable
Giovanni Bernardino Azzolini or Mazzolini or Asoleni, Italian painter (died 1645)

Deaths
March 5 - Giulio Campi, Italian painter and architect (born 1500)
November 23 – Agnolo di Cosimo, Italian artist and poet (born 1503)
December 22 - François Clouet, French Renaissance miniaturist and painter (born 1510)
date unknown
Mir Sayyid Ali, Persian illustrator and painter (born 1510)
Mirabello Cavalori, Italian painter mainly active in Florence (born 1520)
Danese Cattaneo – Italian sculptor (born 1509)
probable - Jean Goujon, French sculptor and architect during the French Renaissance (born c.1510)

 
Years of the 16th century in art